John Ruskin is a portrait of the leading Victorian art critic John Ruskin (1819–1900). It was painted by the Pre-Raphaelite artist John Everett Millais (1829–1896) during 1853–54. John Ruskin was an early advocate of the Pre-Raphaelite group of artists and part of their success was due to his efforts.

The painting depicts Ruskin in front of a waterfall in Glenfinlas, Scotland. Ruskin and Millais spent the summer of 1853 together at Glenfinlas in the Trossachs. Ruskin was especially interested in the rock formations and undertook his own studies of these.

Creation
The painting of Ruskin was started at Glenfinlas, during which the details of the landscape were painted. The last stages of work on the painting were undertaken in Millais' studio in London. By that time Ruskin's wife Effie had fallen in love with Millais. She left Ruskin and sued him for an annulment of the marriage. She and Millais were married the following year.

Millais found it very difficult to be in the same room as Ruskin when he was completing the work in London, calling it "the most hateful task I have ever had to perform". As soon as the portrait was finished he broke off contact with Ruskin. Ruskin himself temporarily moved the portrait so that his father would not see it, since he was concerned that he would damage or destroy it.

Provenance
The painting was given by Ruskin to his friend Henry Wentworth Acland in 1871. It was left to his daughter, the photographer Sarah Angelina Acland, who kept it above her desk at the family home in Oxford and later at her own home in Park Town, North Oxford, where she photographed it. It was then passed down through the family until it was sold at Christie's in 1965. The purchaser retained the painting until their death in 2012. It was accepted by the British Government in lieu of inheritance tax in 2013 and permanently allocated to the Ashmolean Museum, Oxford, to which it had been on loan since 2012 and where it has been on display since 2013.
 
The painting has been exhibited several times, including exhibitions on the Pre-Raphaelites at Tate Britain London, during 1984 and 2004. It is valued at £7.0 million.

References

External links

1854 paintings
19th-century portraits
Paintings by John Everett Millais
Portraits by English artists
Paintings in the collection of the Ashmolean Museum
Oil on canvas paintings
 John Ruskin (Millais)
Water in art
John Ruskin